Dr. John Marcus Blatchly MBE FSA (7 October 1932 – 3 September 2015) was a schoolmaster, author and noted historian of the county of Suffolk.

The son of Alfred Ernest Blatchly and Edith Selina Giddings, he studied natural sciences at the University of Cambridge and became a chemistry teacher. From 1972 to 1993 he was headmaster of Ipswich School in Suffolk. After retiring, he served as the school's archivist emeritus and published a history of the school.

A keen local historian, he also served as chairman of the Suffolk Records Society, president of the Suffolk Institute of Archaeology & History. As chairman of the Ipswich Historic Churches Trust, essential repair works were carried out four redundant medieval churches. St. Lawrence's became a community restaurant; St. Nicholas's was revamped for the Church of England for use as a conference and meetings venue; St Clement's is to be used as the Ipswich Arts Centre; the Ipswich Tourist Information Centre has been installed in St Stephen's. He rescued the town's 16th-century library and issued a meticulous catalogue; and, in response to his forceful initiative, the town acknowledged its celebrated son, Cardinal Wolsey, with a bronze statue. His passionate interest in Wolsey and his Cardinal's College in Ipswich was reflected in John's election in 2014 as honorary Wolsey professor at University Campus Suffolk. He was awarded an MBE in 2006 for services to heritage and was elected honorary Wolsey Professor at University Campus Suffolk in 2014.

Photographs by John Blatchly are held at the Conway Library of the Courtauld Institute, London, and are being digitised.

The John Blatchly Local Studies Library is a reference librarylocated at The Hold, a purpose-built heritage centre in Ipswich opened by the Suffolk Record Office in 2021.

Selected publications
Isaac Johnson of Woodbridge, 1754–1835: that ingenious artist (1979)
Topographers of Suffolk (1988)
The Town Library of Ipswich Provided for the Use of the Town Preachers in 1599: A History and Catalogue (1989)
The Bookplates of Edward Gordon Craig (1997)
The Bookplates of George Wolfe Plank, and a Selection of his Book Illustrations (2002)
A Famous Antient Seed-plot of Learning: A History of Ipswich School (2003)
East-Anglian Ex-Libris: Bookplates and Labels Made Between 1700 and the Present Day (2008)
Ipswich School: A History in Old Photographs from the 1850s to the 1980s (2009)
Miracles in Lady Lane: The Ipswich Shrine at the Westgate (2013), with Diarmaid MacCulloch

References 

2015 deaths
History of Suffolk
Schoolteachers from Suffolk
Fellows of the Society of Antiquaries of London
1932 births